The  is a national expressway in the Kinki region of Japan. It is owned and operated by West Nippon Expressway Company.

Naming 
Hanwa is a kanji acronym of two characters. The first character represents Osaka (大阪) and the second character represents Wakayama (和歌山).

Officially, the route is designated as the Kinki Expressway Matsubara Nachikatsuura Route, however this designation does not appear on any signage.

Overview
The expressway is an important route connecting the greater Osaka area with Wakayama, the capital of Wakayama Prefecture. Beyond Wakayama, the route follows a southerly course parallel to the Pacific Ocean to its terminus with National Route 42 in Tanabe.

The first section of the expressway was opened to traffic in 1974. The final section of the expressway (5.8 km between Minabe Interchange and Nanki-Tanabe Interchange) was opened on November 11, 2007.

The expressway is 6 lanes from Matsubara Junction to Sakai Junction, 4 lanes from Sakai Junction to Arida Interchange and the remainder is 2 lanes. Construction to expand the route to 4 lanes is currently underway on the section between Arida Interchange and Gobō Interchange. The speed limit is 80 km/h on 4 to 6-laned sections and 70 km/h on 2-laned sections.

List of interchanges and features

 IC - interchange, SIC - smart interchange, JCT - junction, SA - service area, PA - parking area, BS - bus stop, TN - tunnel, BR - bridge

External links 
 West Nippon Expressway Company

Expressways in Japan